P. mitchelli may refer to:
 Platysaurus mitchelli, the Mitchell's flat lizard, a lizard species found in Malawi
 Pseudeutropius mitchelli, an endemic fish species found in India in the genus Pseudeutropius
 Pseudocellus mitchelli, a hooded tickspider species found in Mexico

See also
 Mitchelli (disambiguation)